In mathematics, Kōmura's theorem is a result on the differentiability of absolutely continuous Banach space-valued functions, and is a substantial generalization of Lebesgue's theorem on the differentiability of the indefinite integral, which is that Φ : [0, T] → R given by

is differentiable at t for almost every 0 < t < T when φ : [0, T] → R lies in the Lp space L1([0, T]; R).

Statement
Let (X, || ||) be a reflexive Banach space and let φ : [0, T] → X be absolutely continuous. Then φ is (strongly) differentiable almost everywhere, the derivative φ′ lies in the Bochner space L1([0, T]; X), and, for all 0 ≤ t ≤ T,

References
   (Theorem III.1.7)

Theorems in measure theory
Theorems in functional analysis